Jonathan Herrera may refer to:
 Jonathan Herrera (baseball) (born 1984), Venezuelan baseball infielder
 Jonathan Herrera (footballer, born 1991), Argentine forward
 Jonathan Herrera (footballer, born 2001), Mexican forward